Rhodocollybia fodiens is a species of fungus in the mushroom family Marasmiaceae.

References

External links

 Image
 Image
 Image

Marasmiaceae

Rhodocollybia